Sir John Leonard Knox (6 August 1925 – 28 May 2015) was a British High Court judge, sitting in the Chancery division.

He was appointed on 26 July 1985, and retired on 30 September 1996.  Whilst sitting he was styled as Mr Justice Knox or Knox J.

Prior to his elevation to the bench, Sir John practised as a barrister from what is now termed Radcliffe Chambers.

He was Attorney-General of the Duchy of Lancaster from 1984 to 1986.

Notable cases
Notable judicial decisions that Knox J was involved in included:
 Smith v Croft (No 2) [1988] Ch 114 relating to derivative claims.
 Re Produce Marketing Consortium Ltd (No 2) [1989] 5 BCC 569 relating to wrongful trading.
 Re New Bullas Trading Ltd [1994] 1 BCLC 485 at first instance, relating to floating charges.
 Re MC Bacon Ltd (No 1) [1990] BCLC 324 at the preliminary strike-out stage, relating to wrongful trading and unfair preferences.
 Re Curtain Dream plc [1990] BCLC 925 in relation to recharacterisation.

Offices

Arms

Footnotes

1925 births
2015 deaths
Knights Bachelor
Chancery Division judges
Attorneys-General of the Duchy of Lancaster
English King's Counsel
20th-century King's Counsel